Retila Magazine was founded in Los Angeles in 1995 by Rafael Martinez, Frank Barbano and Guillermo Quezada. The pocket-size magazine was one of the first full-color magazine that focus in the Spanish Rock movement of the early 1990s. Retila [acronym for "Rock En Tu Idioma Los Angeles"], published 20 volumes between 1995 and 2000. Great writers like Francisco Bican and Edith Bican helped the magazine to have a loyal following due to its articles and monthly calendar of events. The free magazine was mostly distributed at concerts, night clubs, and record stores. The magazine had major sponsors, such as MGD, Mt. Dew, and Pepsi jumped aboard and uses the magazines grass-roots style to introduce their products to young Hispanics.

References

Music magazines published in the United States
Free magazines
Magazines established in 1995
Magazines disestablished in 2000
Rock en Español
Spanish-language magazines
Magazines published in Los Angeles
Defunct magazines published in the United States